Bondaruz (also Romanized as Bondārūz and Bandārūz) is a village in Howmeh Rural District of the Central District of Dashtestan County, Bushehr province, Iran. At the 2006 census, its population was 1,764 in 392 households. The following census in 2011 counted 2,933 people in 535 households. The latest census in 2016 showed a population of 3,724 people in 751 households; it was the largest village in its rural district.

References 

Populated places in Dashtestan County